In mathematics, the Kronecker product, sometimes denoted by ⊗, is an operation on two matrices of arbitrary size resulting in a block matrix. It is a specialization of the tensor product (which is denoted by the same symbol) from vectors to matrices and gives the matrix of the tensor product linear map with respect to a standard choice of basis. The Kronecker product is to be distinguished from the usual matrix multiplication, which is an entirely different operation. The Kronecker product is also sometimes called matrix direct product.

The Kronecker product is named after the German mathematician Leopold Kronecker (1823–1891), even though there is little evidence that he was the first to define and use it. The Kronecker product has also been called the Zehfuss matrix, and the Zehfuss product, after , who in 1858 described this matrix operation, but Kronecker product is currently the most widely used.

Definition 
If A is an  matrix and B is a  matrix, then the Kronecker product  is the  block matrix:

more explicitly:

and

Examples 

Similarly:

Properties

Relations to other matrix operations

Abstract properties

Matrix equations 
The Kronecker product can be used to get a convenient representation for some matrix equations. Consider for instance the equation , where A, B and C are given matrices and the matrix X is the unknown. We can use the "vec trick" to rewrite this equation as

Here, vec(X) denotes the vectorization of the matrix X, formed by stacking the columns of X into a single column vector.

It now follows from the properties of the Kronecker product that the equation  has a unique solution, if and only if A and B are invertible .

If X and C are row-ordered into the column vectors u and v, respectively, then 

The reason is that

Applications 
For an example of the application of this formula, see the article on the Lyapunov equation. This formula also comes in handy in showing that the matrix normal distribution is a special case of the multivariate normal distribution. This formula is also useful for representing 2D image processing operations in matrix-vector form.

Another example is when a matrix can be factored as a Hadamard product, then matrix multiplication can be performed faster by using the above formula. This can be applied recursively, as done in the radix-2 FFT and the Fast Walsh–Hadamard transform. Splitting a known matrix into the Hadamard product of two smaller matrices is known as the "nearest Kronecker product" problem, and can be solved exactly by using the SVD. To split a matrix into the Hadamard product of more than two matrices, in an optimal fashion, is a difficult problem and the subject of ongoing research; some authors cast it as a tensor decomposition problem.

In conjunction with the least squares method, the Kronecker product can be used as an accurate solution to the hand eye calibration problem.

Related matrix operations  
Two related matrix operations are the Tracy–Singh and Khatri–Rao products, which operate on partitioned matrices.

Tracy–Singh product 
The Tracy–Singh product is defined as

which means that the (ij)-th subblock of the  product  is the  matrix , of which the (k)-th subblock equals the  matrix . Essentially the Tracy–Singh product is the pairwise Kronecker product for each pair of partitions in the two matrices.

For example, if A and B both are  partitioned matrices e.g.:

we get:

Khatri–Rao product 

 Block Kronecker product
 Column-wise Khatri–Rao product

Face-splitting product 

Mixed-products properties
 

where  denotes the Face-splitting product.

 

Similarly:
 

 

 

Similarly:
 
 ,

 

where  denotes the Column-wise Khatri–Rao product.

Similarly:
 
 

See also 
 Generalized linear array model
 Hadamard product (matrices)
 Kronecker coefficient

Notes

References

External links 
 
 
 
 
  The entry on the Kronecker, Zehfuss, or Direct Product of matrices has historical information.
 
  Software source in more than 40 languages.

Matrix theory